Halsted is an 'L' station on the CTA's Orange Line. The station is located at the intersection of Halsted Street and Archer Avenue in the Bridgeport neighborhood. The 8 Halsted, 44 Wallace/Racine, and 62 Archer bus routes serve the station as well.

Bus connections
CTA
8 Halsted
44 Wallace/Racine
62 Archer (Owl Service)

References

External links 

Chicago L.org: Stations - Halsted/Archer

Halsted Station Page CTA official site
Archer Avenue entrance from Google Maps Street View

Bridgeport, Chicago
CTA Orange Line stations
Railway stations in the United States opened in 1993